James Frederick is a YouTuber and solo sailor best known for sailing his 1965 Alberg 30 Triteia as part of his YouTube channel Sailing Triteia.  Frederick was raised in Southern California and dropped out of school at the age of 15. In August 2021 Frederick began his second attempt at sailing to Hawaii from California, during the voyage 1000 miles from Hawaii he lost his rudder and was forced to steer the rest of the way using a drogue. For this he was awarded the 2021 Qualifiers Mug from the Ocean Cruising Club. After spending the winter in Hawaii and repairing his rudder Frederick continued on towards French Polynesia.

References 

YouTube vloggers
American sailors
Living people
Single-handed circumnavigating sailors